The 2003 HEW Cyclassics was the eighth edition of the HEW Cyclassics cycle race and was held on 3 August 2003. The race started and finished in Hamburg. The race was won by Paolo Bettini.

General classification

References

2003
2003 in German sport
HEW Cyclassics
2003 in road cycling
August 2003 sports events in Europe